Anđa Jelavić (born 21 September 1980) is a former Croatian female basketball player and current basketball coach. At the 2012 Summer Olympics, she competed for the Croatian national team in the women's event. She is 5 ft 8 inches (1 m 72 cm) tall.

Career as coach
In April 2017, she was named the head coach of the Croatian women national team, instead of Braslav Turić, who was sacked. On 12 February 2019 she announced she is going to leave the Croatian national team because of family problems.

References

External links
Profile at eurobasket.com

1980 births
Living people
People from Tomislavgrad
Croats of Bosnia and Herzegovina
Croatian women's basketball players
Olympic basketball players of Croatia
Basketball players at the 2012 Summer Olympics
ŽKK Gospić players
ŽKK Novi Zagreb players
ŽKK Šibenik players
Mediterranean Games bronze medalists for Croatia
Competitors at the 2009 Mediterranean Games
Mediterranean Games medalists in basketball
Shooting guards